James Harlan is the name of:
James Harlan (Iowa politician) (1820–1899), U.S. Senator and U.S. Secretary of the Interior
James Harlan (Walker), a statue of Harlan by Nellie Walker
James Harlan (Kentucky politician) (1800–1863), state Attorney General and Secretary of State and U.S. Representative
James S. Harlan (1861–1927), American lawyer and commerce specialist
Jim Harlan (born 1954), American football player